The 2018–19 version of the Syrian Cup is the 49th edition to be played. It is the premier knockout tournament for football teams in Syria. Al-Jaish are the defending champions.

The competition has been disrupted because of the ongoing Syrian Civil War, where some games have been awarded as 3:0 victories due to teams not being able to compete.

The winners of the competition will enter the 2020 AFC Cup.

First round

Second round

Final phase

Bracket

Third round

Fourth round

Quarter-finals

First leg

Second leg

Semi-finals

First leg

Second leg

Final

References

Syrian Cup
Syria
Cup